The 1960 United States presidential debates were a series of debates held during the 1960 presidential election among Democratic nominee John F. Kennedy and Republican nominee Richard Nixon. The four presidential debates were the first series of debates conducted for any presidential election. The next presidential debate did not occur until 1976, after which debates would become a regular feature of all presidential campaigns.

Some believe that those who listened to the first debate on radio thought that Nixon had won, while those who watched that debate on television thought that Kennedy had won.

Background 
In 1960, John F. Kennedy, a senator from Massachusetts was nominated by the Democratic party as their presidential nominee. He chose the Senate Democratic leader Lyndon B. Johnson as his running mate. The Republican party nominated the incumbent vice president Richard Nixon as their presidential nominee, with Henry Cabot Lodge Jr., the United States ambassador to the United Nations as his running mate. Most polls after the party conventions showed the NixonLodge ticket having a six point lead over the KennedyJohnson ticket.

Debates

Schedule

First presidential debate (WBBM-TV, Chicago) 
The first presidential debate was held at WBBM-TV, Chicago on Monday September 26, 1960. Howard K. Smith moderated the debate with Sander Vanocur, Charles Warren, Stuart Novins and Bob Fleming as panelists. Questions were restricted to internal or domestic American matters. The format decided was:

 Eight minute opening statements
 Two and a half minute responses to questions
 Optional rebuttal
 three minute closing statements.

Nixon refused make-up for the first debate, subsequently his facial stubble showed prominently on the black-and-white television screens at the time. During the debate, Nixon started sweating under the studio lights. His light gray suit faded into the backdrop of the set and seemed to match his skin tone. Reacting to this, his mother immediately called him and asked whether he was sick. Chicago Mayor Richard J. Daley in an interview said:

Nixon blamed his poor performance on hitting his knee on a car door in Greensboro, North Carolina, after which he had to be hospitalized for a staph infection.

Second presidential debate (WRC-TV, Washington D.C.) 

The second presidential debate was held at WRC-TV, Washington D.C. on Friday October 7, 1960. Frank McGee moderated the debate with Paul Niven, Edward P. Morgan, Alan Spivak and Harold R. Levy as panelists. Questions were related to internal American matters, foreign relations, economy, etc. The format decided was:
 No opening or closing statements
 Each questioned in turn with optional rebuttal

Third presidential debate (ABC Studios New York and Los Angeles) 
The third presidential debate was held virtually at ABC studio in Los Angeles for Nixon and ABC studio in New York City for Kennedy on October 13, 1960. Bill Shadel moderated the debate with Frank McGee, Charles Van Fremd, Douglass Cater and Roscoe Drummond as panelists. Shadel moderated the debate from a different television studio in Los Angeles. The topic of the debate was whether military force should be used to prevent Quemoy and Matsu, two island archipelagos off the Chinese coast, from falling under Communist control. The format decided was:

 No opening or closing statements
 Each questioned in turn with two and a half minutes to answer
 One and a half minute rebuttals optional

This debate was considered a "monumental step for television".

Fourth presidential debate (ABC studio, New York City) 
The fourth presidential debate was held at ABC studio, New York City on Friday October 21, 1960. Quincy Howe moderated the debate with Frank Singiser, John Edwards, Walter Cronkite and John Chancellor as panelists. Questions were related to Foreign affairs. The format decided was:
 Eight minute opening statements
 Each questioned in turn with two and a half minutes to answer
 One and a half minute rebuttal
 Three minute closing statements.

References

Works cited 
Books

 
 

Other sources

 
 
 
 
 
 

United States presidential debates
Presidential debates
Presidential debates
Speeches by John F. Kennedy
Speeches by Richard Nixon
United States presidential debates
Debates